Amanita betulae is a species of Amanita found in growing in birch and mixed hardwood in Europe

References

External links

betulae
Fungi of Europe
Fungi described in 2009